Javanrud (also Romanized as Javānrūd; also known as Qal‘a Jūanrūd, Qal‘eh Jūānrūd, and Qal‘eh-ye Javānrūd, all meaning "Fort Javanrud", and Jūānrū) is a city in Javanrud County, Kermanshah Province, Iran. At the 2006 census, its population was 43,104, comprising 9,591 families. The city of Javanrud is located 79 kilometers north of Kermanshah and is 1300 meters above sea level.

Etymology 
The name of the city is derived from the Kurdish Javanrud tribe, which had formerly dominated the area, and which has now become almost fully urban.

History 
During its early history, Javanrud was part of the loosely defined Ardalan province, the previous name of the present-day Kurdistan province. In 1909, its vali (governor) Aman-Allah Khan Ardalan ordered the construction of a fortress named Qal'a-ye Javanrud on a small hill near the middle of the Javanrud. In the mid-1970s, Javanrud was added to the Kermanshah province, later receiving its own sub-province in 1989.

Demographics 
The city is populated by Kurds, from various tribal backgrounds, who adhere to Sunni Islam. However, the Jaff tribe is the main tribe in the city. The two Sufi branches Naqshbandi and Qadiriyya have a strong presence in the city as well. The locals speak Gorani, Sorani and Persian.

See also

Ravansar
Paveh

References

Populated places in Javanrud County
Cities in Kermanshah Province
Kurdish settlements in Kermanshah Province